La Nueva Familia Michoacana is a criminal organization formed in 2011 after the original La Familia Michoacana lost power in 2010 with the formation of the Knights Templar Cartel and Nazario Moreno's suspected death (he was not proven dead until 2014 with a DNA test). It is dedicated to drug trafficking and battling the CJNG criminal organization out of Tierra Caliente in Michoacán and Guerrero. Many of its leaders have been arrested for threatening and blackmailing people on social media. La Nueva Familia Michoacana operates in the southern areas of Mexico.

Social media threats
In 2019, a leader from the cell called El Zarco threatened El Mencho by telling him they were going to kill his hitmen by the Balsas River. The threat went viral that a few weeks later CJNG members threatened to assassinate El Zarco.

Sanctions 
The Treasury alleges the group is implicated in a mix of criminal and drug trafficking activities, including the cultivation of opium poppy and U.S. distribution of heroinand, in an emerging trend, “rainbow” fentanyl (pills and powders whose bright colors, shapes, and sizes are marketed to young users).

References

Organized crime groups in Mexico
Mexican drug war
La Familia Michoacana